The On The Road Again Tour was the fourth headlining concert tour and second all-stadium tour by English-Irish boy band One Direction, in support of their fourth studio album, Four (2014). The tour began on 7 February 2015 in Sydney, Australia and ended on 31 October 2015 in Sheffield, England. The tour grossed $208 million from 77 shows, selling over 2.3 million tickets. It became the second highest-grossing concert tour of 2015, only behind Taylor Swift's The 1989 World Tour.

Less than two months into the tour, Zayn Malik left the band. His last performance with the group was in Hong Kong on 18 March, while he gave his departure announcement publicly during the band's show in Indonesia on 25 March. The group since continued touring as a foursome and began recording new material that was released in the second half of the year. This was One Direction's last tour before a hiatus began in 2016.

Background 
The tour was announced on the Australian breakfast television program Today on 18 May 2014. The group made their debut performance in some countries on this tour. On 19 January 2015, it was announced that Australian pop singer Samantha Jade would be the opening act for the Australian shows, alongside McBusted.

On 19 March 2015, Zayn Malik announced his decision to exit the tour, citing "stress". Six days later, on 25 March, the band announced Malik's decision to permanently exit the group, citing his desire to live a "normal 22-year old life" and that the remaining members would continue as a four-piece group. In a statement, they said: 

On 1 June 2015, the North American tour was officially announced as a part of 14th Annual Honda Civic Tours.

Set list 
This set list is representative of the show on 7 February 2015 in Sydney. It is not intended to represent all shows from the tour.

"Clouds"
"Steal My Girl"
"Where Do Broken Hearts Go"
"Midnight Memories"
"Kiss You"
"Fireproof"
"Ready to Run"
"Happily"
"Strong"
"Better Than Words"
"Don't Forget Where You Belong"
"Little Things"
"Night Changes"
"18"
"Alive"
"Heart Attack"
"Drag Me Down"
"Diana"
"One Thing"
"No Control"
"What Makes You Beautiful"
"Through the Dark"
"Girl Almighty"
"Perfect"
"Story of My Life"
"You & I"
"Act My Age"
"Little White Lies"
"Little Black Dress"
"Stockholm Syndrome"
"Best Song Ever"

Shows

Cancelled shows

Notes

References

External links 

 Tour announcement

2015 concert tours
One Direction concert tours